The Chouteau Group is a geologic group in Missouri. It preserves fossils dating back to the Mississippian subperiod.

See also

 List of fossiliferous stratigraphic units in Missouri
 Paleontology in Missouri

References

 

Carboniferous Missouri